Gu Bon-gil ( or  ; born 27 April 1989) is a South Korean right-handed sabre fencer.

Gu is an eight-time team Asian champion, seven-time individual Asian champion, and three-time team world champion.

A three-time Olympian, Gu is a two-time team Olympic champion.

Early life 
A native of Daegu, Gu had played football all through elementary and middle school and went on to Osung High School, which was the alma mater of his 2012 Olympics teammate Oh Eun-seok. The fencing coach at Osung High School had already noticed him in middle school and persuaded him to switch sports. He majored in physical education at Dong-Eui University, then one of the few universities which had a fencing team.

Gu was already selected for the youth national teams as a high school student and participated in the 2006 Cadet (Under 17) World Championships. He won individual gold at the Junior (Under 20) World Championships and Junior Asian Championships in 2008.

Career 
Gu was first selected for the senior national team in 2010. He made headlines that year by winning two silver medals in the Grand Prix circuit and individual gold medals at both the Asian Games and Asian Championships. The media dubbed him the "scary rookie" after he narrowly defeated compatriot Oh Eun-seok, then world number 2, in the semi-finals of the Asian Games. His gold medal at the Asian Games meant that he was exempted from mandatory military service.

Gu won two individual gold medals at the 2010–11 Fencing World Cup and ended the competition ranked number 3 overall. He was selected to participate in the 2012 Summer Olympics along with Oh, Kim Jung-hwan and Won Woo-young. The Olympics began on a sour note as he, Kim and Won did not make it past the semi-final stage of the individual event. They managed to win a historic gold in the team event, South Korea's first ever Olympic gold medal in the men's team sabre category. The quartet continued to dominate in the team events, sweeping gold at both the Asian Championships and Asian Games hosted at home and winning silver at the World Championships. They also successfully defended their team gold medal at the 2015 Asian Fencing Championships.

Oh Eun-seok and Won Woo-young both retired and were replaced by youngsters Oh Sang-uk and Kim Jun-ho. There was no men's team sabre event at 2016 Summer Olympics due to the now-abolished rotation policy. Gu and Kim Jung-hwan both qualified for the individual event. However, he was narrowly defeated by Mojtaba Abedini, whom Kim went on to defeat in the bronze medal bout. The following year, the team won gold in the men's team sabre event at the 2017 World Fencing Championships, the country's first team gold at the worlds since 2005, and swept team gold at the 2018 World Championships and Asian Games. Gu himself won individual silver in the 2017 worlds and successfully defended his Asian Games gold the following year.

Kim Jung-hwan announced his retirement after the 2018 Asian Games and was replaced by Ha Han-sol. The team won gold at the 2019 World Fencing Championships, Gu's third consecutive team gold at the worlds. Kim came back out of retirement and reunited with the same team from the 2018 Asian Games and Asian Championships. They qualified for the 2020 Summer Olympics, which had been postponed for a year. Despite the disruption caused by the COVID-19 pandemic and changes to coaching staff, they won team gold, making Gu and Kim the first South Korean fencers (among all fencing disciplines, male or female) to win back-to-back team gold medals at the Olympics.

The 2021–22 World Cup season began uneventfully for Gu as he was not able to participate in the Orléans Grand Prix held in October, having tested positive for COVID-19 the day before the competition. He returned to the team which won gold at both the Men's Team World Cup in January and the World Championships to retain their #1 ranking in the team category. Gu himself finished that season on a high by winning gold at the Asian Championships and medalling for the first time at a Grand Prix event since 2018, only losing to Áron Szilágyi in the Padua Grand Prix final by a single point.

Medal Record

Olympic Games

World Championship

Asian Championship

Grand Prix

World Cup

Filmography

Television shows

Personal life 
Gu earned his master's degree from Kookmin University.

He married flight attendant Park Eun-ju in 2019. In November 2022, Gu announced his wife's pregnancy through a television program.His wife gave birth to a son on March 6, 2023. 

Despite sharing the same family name and bon-gwan (Gu clan of Neungseong), Gu is not an immediate relative of singer and actor Gu Bon-seung or the Koo chaebol family associated with LG Corporation. He and Gu Bon-seung indicated through comments left on one another's official Instagram accounts that they were well aware of the rumors, quipping that it was "an honor" to be mistaken as relatives.

Notes

References

External links

Living people
1989 births
Sportspeople from Daegu
South Korean male sabre fencers
Fencers at the 2012 Summer Olympics
Fencers at the 2016 Summer Olympics
Fencers at the 2020 Summer Olympics
Olympic fencers of South Korea
Olympic gold medalists for South Korea
Olympic medalists in fencing
Medalists at the 2012 Summer Olympics
Medalists at the 2020 Summer Olympics
Fencers at the 2010 Asian Games
Fencers at the 2014 Asian Games
Fencers at the 2018 Asian Games
Asian Games gold medalists for South Korea
Asian Games silver medalists for South Korea
Asian Games medalists in fencing
Medalists at the 2010 Asian Games
Medalists at the 2014 Asian Games
Medalists at the 2018 Asian Games
Universiade medalists in fencing
Universiade silver medalists for South Korea
Universiade bronze medalists for South Korea
Fencers from Seoul
South Korean Buddhists
Medalists at the 2011 Summer Universiade
Medalists at the 2017 Summer Universiade
Dong-Eui University alumni
World Fencing Championships medalists